Simpkinstown is an unincorporated community in Pulaski County, in the U.S. state of Virginia.  Although listed as a community, the area is considered "Snowville" by local residents.

References

Unincorporated communities in Virginia
Unincorporated communities in Pulaski County, Virginia